Jonathan Cecil Harris (born June 9, 1974) is a former American football defensive end in the National Football League for the Philadelphia Eagles, Cleveland Browns, and the Green Bay Packers.  He played college football at the University of Virginia and was drafted in the first round (25th overall) of the 1997 NFL Draft.  He currently resides in Swedesboro, New Jersey.

NFL career 

After the 1998 NFL season, the Philadelphia Eagles traded Harris to the Green Bay Packers in exchange for John Michels, but Harris never played for the Packers. In his two-season career, Harris played in 24 games (starting eight), and recorded two sacks.

1974 births
Living people
American football defensive ends
Philadelphia Eagles players
Sportspeople from Brooklyn
Players of American football from New York City
Berlin Thunder players
Oakland Raiders players
Cleveland Browns players
Green Bay Packers players
Virginia Cavaliers football players